Dillingen may refer to:

Dillingen (district), in Bavaria, Germany
 Counts of Dillingen, whose seat was at Dillingen an der Donau
Dillingen an der Donau, capital of the district
Dillingen, Saarland, in the district of Saarlouis, Germany
Dillingen, Luxembourg, in the commune of Beaufort, Luxembourg